IBRS may refer to:

 International Business Reply Service, a postal service
 Indirect Branch Restricted Speculation, an extended feature flag for the x86 architecture
 Princess Anastasia (1986) (callsign IBRS), a cruiseferry

See also
 IBR (disambiguation)